Halopiger is a genus of archaeans in the family Natrialbaceae that have high tolerance to salinity.

Species 
The following species are classified in the genus Halopiger:
Halopiger aswanensis Hezayen, Gutiérrez, Steinbüchel, Tindall and Rehm, 2010
Halopiger salifodinae Zhang, Meng, Zhu and Wu, 2013
Halopiger thermotolerans Minegishi et al., 2017
Halopiger xanaduensis Gutierrez et al., 2007

Species formerly placed in this taxon
 Halopiger salifodinae, now Natrinema salifodinae

References

Further reading

Scientific journals

Scientific books

Scientific databases

External links

Archaea genera